Justin Robertson is an English electronic musician, DJ, author, artist and record producer.

Discography

DJ Mix albums

Journeys by DJs
Journeys by DJs Select Tape
Cream Live
Bugged Out
Imprint
Art of Acid

Lionrock

Albums
An Instinct for Detection (1996) - UK #30
City Delirious (1998) - UK #73'

Singles

"Lionrock" (1992) - UK #63
"Packet of Peace" (1993) - UK #32
"Carnival" (1993) - UK #34
"Tripwire" (1994) - UK #44
"Straight at Yer Head" (1996) - UK #33
"Fire Up the Shoeshaw" (1996) - UK #43
"Project Now" (1996)
"She's on the Train" (1997)
"Wet Roads Glisten" (1997)
"Rude Boy Rock" (1998) - UK #20
"Scatter and Swing" (1998) - UK #98[1]

Remixes as Justin Robertson/The Prankster

A Guy Called Gerald – Voodoo Ray
A Man Called Adam – Barefoot in the Head (with Caged Baby)
Annie – Better
Apollo 440 – Lost in Space
Ariel – Food Wine Food
Ariel – Sea of Beats
Ariel – the Chunk
Astronuts – Voyager
Audioweb – Faker
Ben Mill – Faith in G Minor
Björk – Big Time Sensuality
Black Star Liner – Superfly and Bindi
Boxcar – Universal Hymn
Caged Baby – Golden Triangle
Candy Flip – Redhills Road
Candyland – Bittermoon
Cerrones – Cerrone's Paradise
The Charlatans – My Beautiful Friend
The Chemical Brothers – Music Response
Cherry Ghost – 4 AM
Chicken Lips – Do It Proper
Coco Steel and Lovebomb – Feel It
Concretes – Kids
D-Code – Odyssey 
Deep Creed – Warriors Dance
DKS – Pump up the Volume
Dub Federation – Keep on Giving
Dub Pistols – Back to Daylight
Elevator Suite – 
Erasure – Snappy
Fatboy Slim – Push and Shove
Fatboy Slim – The Joker
Felix the Housecat – Harlot
Filthy Dukes – Nonsense in the Dark
Fini Tribe – Ace Love Deuce
Fini Tribe – Forevergreen
Fini Tribe – Mellow Man
Fluke – Slid
Fortran 5 – Heart on the Line
Freaks – Creeps
Gary Clail – These Things Are Worth Fighting For
The Grid – Crystal Clear
The Grid – Roller Coaster
The Grid – Texas Cowboys
GTR – Manco Cepacs Revenge
Hacksaw – the Dawn
Happy Mondays – Sunshine and Love
If – Saturdays Angels
IFL – the Brave
Inspiral Carpets – Caravan
Inspiral Carpets – Skidoo
Ladytron – 17
Little Axe – Ride on
Lizzie Tear – Face in My Mind
Mad Jacks – Feel the Hit
Mad Jacks – Get to That
Manic Street Preachers – Australia
Midlake – Roscoe
Moodswings – Hozanna
Neglectarinos – Music Machine
New Fast Automatic Daffodils – This Is Fascism
New Kingdom – If Unicorns Were Horses
New Order – 1963
The Others – Desolate
The Overlords – Gods Eye
The Overlords – Wow Mr Yogi
Pimp – The Light
Pioneers – Sweet Inspiration
Progress – Weird Life
Rachid Taha – Indie
Rachid Taha – Voila Voila
Radio 4 – Start a Fire
Rare – Seems Like
React to Rhythm – Intoxication
Republica – Out of This World
Saint Etienne – Nothing Can Stop Us Now
Shamen – Boss Drum
SLD – Getting Out
Slick Sixty – the Wrestler
Sly and Lovechild – Spirit of Destiny
Stereo Mcs – Creation
Stone Roses – Waterfall
Stush – Fools Gold
Suede – Chemistry Between Us
Sugar Merchants – Throw Away
Sugarcubes – Birthday
Sugarcubes – Motorcrash
The Summit – Project X
Talk Talk – Dum Dum Girl
TC 1992 – Funky Guitar
Tommy Four Seven – Eat Me
Transglobal Underground – International Times
Wally Lopez-Patricia never leaves the house
WestBam – Celebration Generation
The Whip – Sister Siam
Wire – So Slow
Yargo – Love Revolution

The Prankster

Singles

Sounds of the Burning Spear

Peter Perfect

Singles

Pitstop
Anthill

Gentleman Thief

Singles
Havanna Twilight
Jam the Channel
We generate love

King Marvel Invention

Singles
Claypipe

Revtone

Albums
Justin Robertson presents Revtone (2001)

Singles

The Brightest thing(2001)
Everpresent/The Brightest thing Remixes (2002) 
Love Movement Berlin mixes(2003)

Justin Robertson

Singles

Have Mercy/Blister Boy
Ruckus Juice/ Acid Rave Music
Gyroscope (2007)
Pylon Theory (2007)
Zazous (2007)
Yes it is (With Tim Burgess)
Save me (with Ernest Ranglin and Nadine Sutherland)

Guest Vocals
Anil Chawla - We are all together
Bpa - Island
Beltec - We Weren't born to Die
Fatboy Slim - Push and Shove

Thee Earls

Albums
Nine Days (2010)

Singles
Bombs to fall

The Deadstock 33s

Albums

The Pilgrim's Ghost - 2014
Everything is Turbulence - 2015

Singles/ eps

Confluence of Torrents ep for Clouded Vision
Leipzig Bicycle ep for Days of Being Wild
The Circular Path 
I Am Steppenwolf/Release the Primitive 
Underneath the Pines (single)
Ritual ep
Stranger ep
One Lone Rider ep
Project Mercury
Cavalry/ The Devil's Paintbrush
Up with the sun
We Could Be
Drifting on a wave/ Echo Sound
Voodoo Swamp ep

With Daniel Avery 

Daniel Avery and The Deadstock 33S - Tunnel - a track for Jennifer Cardini's CORRESPONDANT LABEL.
Daniel Avery and The Deadstock 33S - Nylon Icon EP
The Deadstock 33S and Stopmakingme -4 Track EP FOR Tigersushi- PARK DRIVE/OSCILLATE/GRAVITY/A RISING MADNESS
The Deadstock 33S and Stopmakingme -Autumn
The Deadstock 33S and Stopmakingme -On Rushmore EP
The Deadstock 33S and Stopmakingme -Machinist/Battery Life

The Deadstock 33s Remixes

2 Bears – Time in Mind
Amber Arcades - Turning Lights
Andre VII – Discotecca Clandestina
Andrew Weatherall - The Confidence Man
Arveene and Misk – Mi casa
Asphodells - Beglammered
Asteroids – This Distance
Brothertiger – You're Afraid
Bryan Ferry - Driving me wild
Cabaret Nocturne – Astro Tango
Cannibal Ink - Le Petit Prince
Cheval Sombre - Couldn't Do
Clap Rules – Happyhamony
Cosomonauts – Es vedra
Coyote – Drop Out
Chris Massey - Love from Lagos
Dan Beaumont - Trippy Pumper
Dark Horses - Boxing Day
David Shaw and the Beat - Trance in Mexico
Denney - On & On
dEUS – Quattre Mains
Dimitri Veimar - Space Glue
Dj Rocca - Popibox
DJ Shine – Arikanto
Erol Alkan and Boysnoize – Lemonade
Eskimo Twins - Judas
Filthy Dukes – Animals
Fini Tribe - Detestimony
The Ghost – City Lights
The Glimmers – Killing Jokes
Golden Bug – Coco
Grace Jones – Love You to Life
In Flagranti – Rabbit Hole
Japanese Popstars – Forever
Joakim – Labyrinth (with Daniel Avery)
Justice – On and On
Kinky Noodles – Mystic Toad
Klaxons - Show me
Lionrock – Packet of Peace
London Grammar - If you Wait
Miracle Boy – Octopus
Mother Rose – Refried
Mystery Jets – Serotonin
Noel Gallagher's High Flying Birds – She Taught Me How To Fly
Paul Weller – When Your Gardens Overgrown
People Get Real – Deep Breath
Phil Keiran - I Can't stop
Poncho – Daft Murph
Pink Skull - Yellow 
Prostitution of Sound - Pos
Public Service Broadcast - Signal 30
Punks Jump Up – Get Down
RDA – Picture Club
Richard Rossa - Ram Vong
Shadowdancer – Catmoves
Sid Le Rock - Here We are
Stay Bless - Distance
Stepkids – Suburban Dream
Stopmakingme – K and Big V
Squarewave - Through My Mind
Sunshine Underground - Finally we arrive
Temples - Shelter Song
Tronikyouth – Think
Tronikyouth - Bell Common
Warm Digits – Grapefruit
Warm Digits – Trans Penine Express
The Whip – Secret Weapon

External links
 Official website
 
 
 
 Telegraph.co.uk Review of The Art of Acid

English electronic musicians
Living people
People educated at Dr Challoner's Grammar School
Musicians from Manchester
Alumni of the University of Manchester
English record producers
English dance musicians
English DJs
Remixers
1968 births
Big beat musicians
Electronic dance music DJs